The Broxbourne Council election, 1984 was held to elect council members of the Broxbourne Borough Council, the local government authority of the borough of Broxbourne,  Hertfordshire, England.

Composition of expiring seats before election

Election results

Results summary 

An election was held in 14 wards on 3 May 1984.

14 seats were contested.

The Conservative Party gained one seat from the Labour Party in Rosedale Ward

The political balance of the council following this election was:

Conservative 33 seats
Labour 5 seats
SDP-Liberal Alliance 4 Seats

Ward results

References
Cheshunt & Waltham Telegraph Friday 11 May 1984 Edition

1984
1984 English local elections
1980s in Hertfordshire